Melvin Dean "Mel, Pee Wee" Read (April 10, 1922 – July 9, 2005) was a Canadian professional ice hockey centre who played in six National Hockey League games for the New York Rangers during the 1946–47 NHL season.

External links

1922 births
2005 deaths
Canadian ice hockey centres
Dallas Texans (USHL) players
Ice hockey people from Montreal
New Haven Ramblers players
New York Rangers players
St. Paul Saints (USHL) players
Verdun Maple Leafs (ice hockey) players